Gaspare Antonio Pietro "Luigi" Gatti (3 January 1875 – 15 April 1912) was an Italian businessman and restaurateur, best known as the manager of the À la Carte restaurant on the RMS Titanic, catering to passengers for whom first-class service was not exclusive enough.

Early life 
Gatti was born on 3 January 1875 in Montalto Pavese, Italy. He was one of eleven children born to Paolo Gatti, a local councillor and magistrate, and Maria Nascimbene.

Personal life 
In 1902, at St Luke's, Hammersmith, Gatti married Edith Kate Cheese, the daughter of steward William James Cheese and his wife Emily of Chelsea. They had a son Luigi Victor, "Vittorio" born in 1904. In 1902, they were living in Hammersmith, in 1911 in Great Titchfield Street, Marylebone, London, and in 1912 in Southampton.

Career 
Gatti owned and ran two restaurants in London, Gatti's Adelphi and Gatti's Strand.

Olympic and Titanic restaurants 

Gatti was already running the À la Carte restaurant on the RMS Olympic, and because of its success, Titanics À la Carte was even larger, able to seat over 150, with over 60 staff, mostly Italian and French, all employed directly by Gatti, who ran these restaurants as concessions. For Titanic'''s maiden voyage, both Gatti and his head chef on Olympic sailed to ensure the new restaurant's success.

Only first class passengers were permitted; they had to book tables in advance and pay a supplement to the first-class fare which included full board in the first-class dining room. Even into the 1890s, dining in public was not considered socially acceptable by some in the upper classes, especially the nobility and "old money", so it was felt necessary in effect to further divide the first class passengers. There was also a reception area for pre-dinner drinks, and a Café Parisien designed to appeal to Americans. The À la Carte restaurant used different china and silver plate from the main first-class restaurant.

 Death 
Gatti went down with the ship, dying on 15 April 1912.Luigi Gatti, sul Titanic un master chef dell'Oltrepo. Roberto Lodigiani & Pier Angelo Vincenzi, la Provincia Pavese, 3 April 2012. Retrieved 6 May 2017. His body was recovered by the CS Minia'' between 26 April and 6 May 1912, and buried in Fairview Cemetery, Halifax, Nova Scotia, Canada.

References

External links 
 Gaspare Antonio Pietro Gatti. titanicdiclaudiobossi.com

1875 births
1912 deaths
Deaths on the RMS Titanic
Italian emigrants to the United Kingdom
People from Pavia
Italian restaurateurs